Biswajit Chakraborty, (born 1 June 1951) is an Indian film actor who appears predominantly in Bengali movies. He was born in Kolkata, West Bengal. His debut movie was Sunya Theke Suru  directed by Ashoke Viswanathan. He has acted in more than a 100 movies including Autograph, Bye Bye Bangkok, and Bollywood movie Kahaani 2.

Filmography 
 Rajnandini (2021)

Television series
 Mithai (4 January 2021 to present)
 Soudaminir Sansar (17 June 2019 to 2021)
 Didi No.1 
Ranga Bou(12 December 2022 to present)

Awards

References

External links

1948 births
Male actors from Kolkata
Living people
Bengali actors
Indian male film actors